Sendai Plain is a plain that spreads over Miyagi Prefecture in Japan. The plain faces Sendai Bay.

References 

Plains of Japan
Landforms of Miyagi Prefecture